The Roman Catholic Diocese of Lishui is a diocese located in the city of Lishui in the Ecclesiastical province of Hangzhou in China.

History
 July 2, 1931: Established as Apostolic Prefecture of Chuzhou from the Apostolic Vicariate of Ningbo 寧波
 May 18, 1937: Renamed as Apostolic Prefecture of Lishui 麗水
 May 28, 1937: Promoted as Apostolic Vicariate of Lishui 麗水
 May 13, 1948: Promoted as Diocese of Lishui 麗水

Leadership
 Bishops of Lishui 麗水 (Roman rite)
 Bishop Kenneth Roderick Turner, S.F.M. (May 13, 1948 – October 31, 1983)
 Vicars Apostolic of Lishui 麗水 (Roman Rite)
 Fr. William Cecil MacGrath, S.F.M. (March 4, 1932 – 1941)

References

 GCatholic.org
 Catholic Hierarchy

Roman Catholic dioceses in China
Christian organizations established in 1931
Roman Catholic dioceses and prelatures established in the 20th century
Christianity in Zhejiang
Lishui